Abdulrahim Mostafa Mohammed Jaizawi [عبدالرحيم مصطفى محمد جيزاوي in Arabic] (born 31 August 1989) is a Saudi footballer who is currently without a team.

Honours

Club
With Al-Ahli (Jeddah)
Gulf Club Champions Cup: 2008
Saudi Champions Cup: 2011, 2012
With Al-Nassr

2008 AFC U-19 Championship: Quarter-finals

Individual
Al-Ahli Player of the Year: 2009-10

References

Saudi Arabian footballers
1989 births
Living people
Al-Ahli Saudi FC players
Al Nassr FC players
Ittihad FC players
Al-Raed FC players
Jeddah Club players
Saudi Professional League players
Saudi First Division League players
Association football wingers